The Charles H. Kerr Publishing Company is an American publishing company. The company was established in Chicago, Illinois, in 1886 as Charles H. Kerr & Co. by Charles Hope Kerr, originally to promote his Unitarian views. As Kerr's personal interests moved from religion to populism to Marxism and he became interested in the labor movement, the company's publications took a similar turn. During the 1920s Kerr ceded control of the firm to the Proletarian Party of America, which continued the imprint as its official publishing house throughout its four decades of organized existence.

Control moved again during the decade of the 1960s, this time to a circle of Chicago radicals with close affinity to the ideas of the Industrial Workers of the World, who gave the company its current operating moniker. The Charles H. Kerr Publishing Company remains in operation in the second decade of the 21st century, making it the oldest radical book publisher in America.

The Charles H. Kerr Publishing Company continues to publish books. Its most recent is Make Love, Not War: Surrealism 1968!, with essays by Penelope Rosemont, Don LaCoss and Michael Lowy.

History

Unitarian origins

In March 1878 a magazine called Unity had been launched by liberal supporter of the Western Unitarian Conference. The wing of the Unitarian movement represented by the new semi-monthly magazine argued that personal character rather than literal belief in a body of written dogma marked the true "test and essence of religion." These so-called "Unity Men" sought wider acceptance among Unitarians for this fundamental idea of the primacy of ethics over belief — a matter of no little controversy among the more conservative church mainstream of the day. A monthly magazine called Unitarian was established in January 1886 in an attempt to combat the ideas of the "Unity men" — who were seen as undermining Christianity in favor of what was characterized as a new "Ethical Culture."

As the controversy between the dissident "ethical" Unitarians and the more conservative "doctrinal" church mainstream heated up, the former felt the need for centralized and expeditious publication of books and other materials reflecting their views. The Georgia-born Charles Hope Kerr, a young man born in 1860 who had joined the staff at Unity magazine in the middle 1880s, obliged by establishing in Chicago in 1886 a publishing house for the "Unity men" called "Charles H. Kerr & Co." The Unity men aspired to promote a sound relationship between the emerging evolutionary science of the day and enlightened religious belief — or, as Kerr himself put it, "a religion that is rational and a rationalism that is religious."

The flagship of the fledgling Kerr & Co. was production of the magazine Unity itself although a literary journal called The University was also briefly issued before being subsumed. In addition to books and magazines, the early Charles H. Kerr & Co. produced an array of pamphlets and hymnals for use of a network of "Unity Clubs" established around the country. Topics explored included comparative religion, advanced biblical criticism, evolutionary science, and history. In addition to Unitarian-related material, Kerr also issued a number of volumes of poetry and literature. The company maintained this orientation for approximately 7 years before making a turn to more temporal themes of economics, politics, and sociology.

Populist period

Charles H. Kerr & Co. was first incorporated in 1893, with 1,000 shares of stock authorized with a par value of $10 per share, representing a total market capitalization of $10,000. That same year marked a change in the firm's direction away from religious themes and towards hard politics. The company began the publication of a new monthly magazine, initially titled New Occasions before a name change was made in July 1897 to The New Time. The "semi-socialist" publication attained a circulation of over 30,000 before being spun off as an independent commercial entity under the direction of editor Frederick Upham Adams. Adams ran into financial difficulties shortly after taking over the magazine, however, and the publication was soon terminated and its subscription list sold to The Arena, a monthly edited by B. O. Flower.

Kerr & Co. were greatly influenced by the growth of the People's Party during the 1890s and issued a wide array of titles on such prominent populist themes as monetary reform, railroad regulation, government control of the banking industry, and related matters. Although some of these titles skirted the edge of socialism, it was not until the spring of 1899 that a decisive turn was made to the international socialism espoused by Karl Marx. A close association was quickly established between the Kerr and Co. and a new Chicago socialist weekly newspaper edited by A. M. Simons, The Workers Call.

Socialist publisher

In January 1900 Simons was brought on board Kerr & Co. as a vice president with a view to launching a new magazine. This would be the International Socialist Review (ISR), a publication which would emerge as among the most important American socialist periodicals during the first two decades of the 20th century. The publication launched with approximately 800 subscribers and by the end of its first year had more than quadrupled this total. With additional individual issues sold in bulk an increased press run of 10,000 copies was predicted by Kerr early in 1901.

The firm was funded as a socialist publisher by the sale of stock, with about $500 worth of stock taken by Kerr personally and a small handful of wealthy benefactors and a somewhat larger amount generated through sale of individual shares at $10 each. Stockholders were not paid dividends and were offered no promise of increased valuation, but rather were allowed to purchase Kerr publications at a deep discount off cover price. The company's pocket-sized "Pocket Library of Socialism" series of 5 cent pamphlets — each covered in distinctive red cellophane — were priced as cheaply as $6 per 1,000 copies when purchased by stockholders; Kerr's small cloth-bound "Standard Socialist Series" of works by Karl Marx, Frederick Engels, Karl Kautsky, and other leading Marxist theoreticians sold at a 50 percent discount, plus freight.

While not a lucrative business model, this promise of cheap socialist literature made the purchase of Kerr stock extremely attractive to locals of the Social Democratic Party of America and its immediate successor, the Socialist Party of America. A very close relationship developed between the company and the organized socialist movement in America, with Kerr handling the bulk of publishing book-length manuscripts and no small number of pamphlets, while the Socialist Party largely limited its publishing efforts to propaganda leaflets and a somewhat tighter array of pamphlets, particularly during the party's earliest years.

Kerr was noted for his translation from the French of the radical workers' movement anthem, "The Internationale;" his version became the English words sung in the United States (although a different, anonymous English translation is sung in Britain and Ireland). Kerr's version was widely circulated in the IWW's Little Red Songbook. In 1906 Kerr published the first volume of Karl Marx's Das Kapital. Kerr & Co. followed this effort with the publication of volumes 2 and 3 of Capital, making use of original translations made by ISR editorial staff member Ernest Untermann and thus becoming the first publisher of this material in the world in the English language. In addition to the first English edition of Marx's Das Kapital, Kerr also published the first English edition of Friedrich Nietzsche's 'Human All Too Human' in 1908, translated by Alexander Harvey, a Belgian-born American journalist.

Increased radicalization

in 1908, publisher Charles H. Kerr, unhappy with what he perceived the scholastic and overly theoretical bent of International Socialist Review, dismissed editor Simons and himself took over the publication's editorial role, assisted by the capable radical Mary Marcy. Reflecting Kerr's own increasingly radical politics, the magazine's political line moved further to the left wing of the socialist movement, with new emphasis given to current events in the strike movement and the activity of the Industrial Workers of the World. The magazine also soon changed in form, making increased use of graphics for the illustration of rather shorter articles printed on glossier paper stock. Although a somewhat polarizing decision, alienating the moderate wing of the Socialist Party, ISR's circulation and influence grew significantly in the years following these changes.

During World War I, the US government denied mailing privileges to all Kerr publications, alleging them to be seditious violations of the Espionage Act of 1917. The ban dealt a fatal blow to the ISR, never a profitable publication in the best of times.

In Canada a 1918 Order in Council of the Canadian government made it illegal for any Canadian to possess any literature published by Charles H. Kerr & Co., under penalty of a $5,000 fine or five years' imprisonment.

Post-war period

Immediately after the war, Charles Kerr came into close contact with the Scottish-born Detroit radical John Keracher through the latter's "Proletarian University" movement and its need for Marxist literature. In 1920, Keracher took a faction out of the underground Communist Party of America and established a small rival organization, the Proletarian Party of America (PPA). Keracher became a member of the Kerr Board of the Directors in 1924 and in 1928 Charles Kerr sold him the bulk of his controlling shares in the firm.

Thereafter, the Proletarian Party controlled the operations of Kerr & Co., publishing a number of Keracher's works, including How the Gods Were Made (1929), Producers and Parasites (1935), The Head-Fixing Industry (1935), Crime: Its Causes and Consequences (1937), and Frederick Engels (1946).  Owing to poor finances and the small size of the organization, comparatively few additional Kerr titles were ever published by the PPA, although the backlist of the company was no doubt invaluable in maintaining the tiny organization's solvency.

New ownership in the 1960s
Following the departure of the Proletarian Party from the scene in the 1960s, Charles H. Kerr & Co. was kept alive by a group of midwestern radicals close to the IWW under its new moniker, Charles H. Kerr Publishing Co. Among this group was Fred W. Thompson, Joseph Giganti, Virgil J. Vogel, and Burt Rosen. Among their major publications were the “Haymarket Scrapbook” Edited by David Roediger and Franklin Rosemont” and the “Big Red Songbook” an anthology of essays and songs of the Wobblies edited by folklorist Archie Green, et al. Today, the Company advertises "Subversive literature for the whole family since 1886."

Company publications

Magazines 
Unity magazine. Vol. 19-20 (1887-88) | Vol. 21-22 (1888-89)
 The New Time magazine. (1897–1899).
 International Socialist Review. Vol. 1 (1900-01) | Vol. 2 (1901-02) | Vol. 3 (1902-03) | Vol. 4 (1903-04) | Vol. 5 (1904-05) | Vol. 6 (1905-06) | Vol. 7 (1906-07) | Vol. 8 (1907-08) | Vol. 9 (1908-09) | Vol. 10 (1909-10) | Vol. 11 (1910-11) | Vol. 12 (1911-12) | Vol. 13 (1912-13) | Vol. 14 (1913-14) | Vol. 15 (1914-15) | Vol. 16 (1915-16) | Vol. 17 (1916-17) | Vol. 18 (1917-18)

International Library of Social Science 
The International Library of Social Science, started at the beginning of 1906. was a collection of volumes described as "positively indispensable to the student of socialism." Each volume cost .

References

Further reading

 Beasley Books, The Pocket Library of Socialism"], Chicago, IL: Beasley Books, n.d.
 David Cochran, "A Socialist Publishing House", History Workshop, No. 24 (Autumn 1987), pp. 162–165. In JSTOR.
 Charles H. Kerr, "Cooperation in Socialist Literature", Chicago: Charles H. Kerr & Co., n.d. [1903]. —Pamphlet by Kerr explaining his publishing house.
 Susan Curtis Mernitz, "The Religious Foundations of America's Oldest Socialist Press: A Centennial Note on the Charles H. Kerr Publishing Company", Labour / Le Travail, vol. 19 (Spring 1987), pp. 133–137. In JSTOR.
 Allen M. Ruff, "Socialist Publishing in Illinois: Charles H. Kerr & Company of Chicago, 1886–1928", Illinois Historical Journal,'' vol. 79, no. 1 (Spring 1986), pp. 19–32. [https://www.jstor.org/stable/40191917 In JSTOR.

External links
 
 Tim Davenport (ed.), "Publications by Charles H. Kerr & Co. (1885-1940s): Listed Alphabetically by Author", Early American Marxism website, www.marxisthistory.org/
 Allen Ruff, "Charles H Kerr Publishing Co. and Wisconsin's 21st Century Politics". Shaping San Francisco, 2011.—Audio file.
 Charles H. Kerr Company Records at the Newberry Library

Book publishing companies based in Illinois
Companies based in Chicago
Industrial Workers of the World in Illinois
Political book publishing companies
Publishing companies established in 1886